The 1981 Finance Funders season was the seventh season of the franchise in the Philippine Basketball Association (PBA).

Transactions
Signed rookie Alejo Alolor, who previously played in Cebu and briefly saw action in the MICAA.
Later acquired Frank Natividad from Crispa.

Imports
Finance, Inc. (formerly Honda Hagibis) had 7-foot-1 Canadian Olympian Jim Zoet and 6–8 Michael Carter as their imports for the Open Conference. Carter played four games and was replaced by James Woods while his partner Jim Zoet played nine games and was replaced by B.B. Davis.

In the Reinforced Filipino Conference, the Funders import was the high-scoring Jessie Boyd.

Won-loss record vs Opponents

Roster

References

Finance
Galerie Dominique Artists